Buckellacris chilcotinae is a species of spur-throated grasshopper in the family Acrididae. It is found in North America.

Subspecies
These two subspecies belong to the species Buckellacris chilcotinae:
 Buckellacris chilcotinae chilcotinae (Hebard, 1922) i c g
 Buckellacris chilcotinae tacoma Rehn and Rehn, 1945 i c g
Data sources: i = ITIS, c = Catalogue of Life, g = GBIF, b = Bugguide.net

References

Melanoplinae
Articles created by Qbugbot
Insects described in 1922